Wang Xiaoyuan (born 12 May 1968) is a Chinese badminton player. She competed in mixed doubles at the 1996 Summer Olympics in Atlanta.

References

External links

1968 births
Living people
Chinese female badminton players
Olympic badminton players of China
Badminton players at the 1996 Summer Olympics